Cedars of Avalon is an album by guitarist Larry Coryell which was recorded in 2001 and released on the HighNote label the following year.

Reception

In his review on Allmusic, Ken Dryden states "One gets the feeling that the musicians were so comfortable playing together that they were actually a working quartet; the feeling of each track is of first-take freshness while being as close to perfection as possible ... This is yet another outstanding release by Larry Coryell". On All About Jazz, C. Andrew Hovan called it a "most enjoyable mainstream set that might surprise some Coryell fanatics but which will easily please all".

Track listing 
All compositions by Larry Coryell except where noted
 "Cedars of Avalon" – 5:14
 "Bemsha Swing" (Denzil Best, Thelonious Monk) – 7:44
 "Fantasy in D" (Cedar Walton) – 6:34
 "Theme for Ernie" (Fred Lacey) – 7:01
 "Limehouse Blues" (Philip Braham, Douglas Furber) – 2:37
 "D-Natural Blues" (Wes Montgomery) – 6:28
 "What's New?" (Bob Haggart, Johnny Burke) – 7:29
 "Newest Blues" (Walton) – 6:12
 "It Could Happen to You" (Jimmy Van Heusen, Burke) – 6:11
 "Shapes" – 2:42

Personnel 
Larry Coryell – guitar
Cedar Walton – piano (tracks 1–4 & 6–9)
Buster Williams – bass (tracks 1–4 & 6–9)
Billy Drummond – drums (tracks 1–4 & 6–9)

References 

Larry Coryell albums
2002 albums
HighNote Records albums
Albums recorded at Van Gelder Studio